is a 12-episode Japanese medical drama television series broadcast in 2010, a sequel to the series Team Batista no Eikō.  Atsushi Itō and Tōru Nakamura reprised their lead roles.

The initial season of "Team Batista" aired on Fuji TV in late 2008 and pulled in strong ratings, leading to a follow-up last October in the special episode "Nightingale no Chinmoku." The dramas were based on the first two novels in a best-selling medical mystery series by writer Takeru Kaido. The new season is based on the third novel, General Rouge no Gaisen. Both "Team Batista no Eiko" and "General Rouge no Gaisen" have also been adapted as a feature films, starring Yūko Takeuchi and Hiroshi Abe. Fuji TV will broadcast "Team Batista 2: General Rouge no Gaisen" on Tuesdays at 10:00pm, beginning on April 6. New cast members this time include Hidetoshi Nishijima, Ai Kato and Miho Shiraishi.

TV Show

Cast
 Atsushi Itō – Kōhei Taguchi (29)
 Tōru Nakamura – Keisuke Shiratori (43)
 Hidetoshi Nishijima – Koichi Hayami (42)
 Ai Kato – Haruka Izumi (29)
 Takayuki Kinoshita (TKO) – Shinji Sato (37)
 Reina Asami – Yayoi Kuriyama (25)
 Tori Matsuzaka – Hideki Takizawa (26)
 Osamu Adachi – Yasutomo Nagayama (25)
 Taro Takeuchi – Kasuhiko Asano (25)
 Keisuke Horibe – Eiji Sasaki
 Go Riju – Daisuke Mifune
 Shigeyuki Totsugi – Takashi Hasegawa (35)
 Miho Shiraishi – Miwa Hanabusa (35)
 Yuko Natori – Makoto Fujiwara
 Ryuzo Hayashi – Kenta Takashina
 Hirotaro Honda – Shida Koichiro

Guest
 Tomoko Tabata – Saki Sugiyama  (ep1)
 Takashi Ito – Shimada Takashi  (ep1)
 Yuri Mizutani – Miho Takayama  (ep1)
 Rinako Matsuoka – Mishima Tisato  (ep1)
 Mina Fujii – Aoki Eri  (ep2)
 Yuta Kanai – Makoto Sugawara  (ep2)
 Tetsu Watanabe – Yasushi Tsukada  (ep3)
 Ritsuko Nemoto – Motoko Tsukada  (ep3)
 Hirofumi Araki – Hiroyuki Tsukada  (ep3)
 Taishi Nakagawa – Hiroyuki Tsukada (young)  (ep3)
 Kyusaku Shimada – Kazuo Meguro (ep1-4)
 Leona Hirota – Mitsuko Meguro (ep1,4)
 Sayuri Iwata – Kanae Mayama  (ep5)
 Yoko Moriguchi – Midori Mayama  (ep5)
 Yumi Asō – Ayako Saitou  (ep5,11)
 Dori Sakurada – Kento Yamazaki (ep6)
 Megumi Oji – Noriko Yamazaki (ep6)
 Ren Yagami – Satoshi Teshigawara (ep7)
 Haruka Suenaga – Risako Shimomura (ep7)
 Denden – Shouzo Terauchi (ep7-10)
 Kotono Shibuya – Yumiko Sakazaki (ep8-10)
 Takashi Yamanaka – Tsuyoshi Takeda (ep10-11)

Episode information

References

Japanese drama television series
Fuji TV original programming
2010 Japanese television series debuts
2010 Japanese television series endings
Television shows based on Japanese novels